B. indicus may refer to:

 Babelomurex indicus, a species of rock snail

 Bayerotrochus indicus, a species of slit snail

 Belonostomus indicus, a prehistoric fish species
Benthenchelys indicus, a species of snake eel
Blepephaeus indicus, a species of longhorn beetle
 Bos indicus, the zebu, a type of domestic cattle
 Bucco indicus, a name proposed for a bird resembling Psilopogon haemacephalus in 1790
 Burhinus indicus, the Indian Stone-curlew
 Butastur indicus, the grey-faced buzzard, an Asian bird of prey

See also
 Indicus (disambiguation)